Qingdao Tram is a tram system operating in Chengyang District, Qingdao, China. It was first launched in 2016. The Qingdao Public Transport Group Rail Bus Co., Ltd. is responsible for its operation and management.

History

In the 1920s, the Qingdao Municipal Government (QMG) planned to build a tramway system to replace some of the existing buses. From 1938 to 1940, Kao Electric Co., Ltd. cooperated with the QMG and set up a "tram preparation office", planning to construct the tramway system together. However, the project wasn't succeed because of the consequent lack of friction between tramway tracks and wheels due to the steep terrain in Qingdao.

As the first tramway system construction project in the EPC (Design-Procurement-Construction) mode in China, the project was completed in 2014 on the 15th of December. From December 17, for the community it was carried out the collection of vehicle signs, body colour, and station name views of the activities. On the morning of 28 December no-load test run was carried out, then continue to line, vehicle, and signal system of the technical parameters of the test and adjustment, driving, crew business practice.

In June 2015, the project was announced by the China Transportation Enterprises Committee as "2015 annual transport enterprises low-carbon energy-saving environmental protection outstanding project." In October, the vehicle field centre machine room axis shaft equipment debugging done, and with the line turnout control area joint test have done. On 18 December, more than 40 representatives of the public were invited to try out the tram.
In January 2016, it was scheduled to carry out tricycle test operation review. On 5 February, the public was allowed to ride the tram as part of a free trial experience without needing a ticket. On 24 February, tricycle third expert review has done. On March 5, it began a formal passenger test operation. On 8 November, the first seven cars on the line, full line with the car were in place.

Tram route and stops

 1 – Chengyang Wholesale Market to Qianwangtuan

There are seven hybrid substations, double insulated elastic suspension mesh, the rated voltage is 750 volts DC.
The stops are - Qianwangtuan station, Tianwang Road station, Shuiku Park station, Huicheng Road Station, Qingwei Road station, Guocheng Road station, Chuncheng Road station, Changcheng Road station, Agricultural University station, Mingyang Road station, Zhengyang Road station, Chengyang Wholesale Market station, a total of 12 stops, of which Agricultural University is an interchange station with Line 1 (Qingdao Metro). The route will be extended to the west to Chengyang railway station.

Practical information

 Total length - 
 Opened - 5 March 2016
 Number of Stops - 12
 Number of routes - 1
 Gauge - Standard Gauge

Fleet

The tram is a Škoda 15 T produced by CRRC Qingdao Sifang. Vehicles are bi-directional and have 3 articulated sections with a total of 6 doors per side of each vehicle. The total passenger volume of each tram is over 300 people.

Depots

The depot could bear the early arrival of the vehicle with the annual inspection, weekly inspection, check, parking, and daily maintenance and so on. One or two repair work was commissioned by the vehicle manufacturers to complete the Quartet.

Alignment and interchanges

The modern tram routes completely run on reserved grass-bed track at middle of the road.

Ride and ticketing system

The tram system uses a manual scheduling management model. Each tram is assigned one driver and three crew members, all of whom are under 35 years old and have at least two years of experience. Passengers pay upon boarding, either with coins or by swiping a card. The one-way fare is 2 yuan.

Projects

See also
 Qingdao Metro

External links

Qingdao
Transport in Qingdao